The Night Boat is a 1980 novel by Robert McCammon. It is about a marine salvage diver, Robert Moore, who uncovers a sunken U-boat underneath a Caribbean lagoon. The boat mysteriously rises to the surface, and the crew are revealed to be still alive.

Reception
Publishers Weekly, reviewing the 2013 reprint, praised its "vividly visceral scenes", but faulted it for "obvious twists", and plotlines that "fizzle" in a "rushed, anticlimactic ending". Don D'Ammassa considered it to be "the most gripping of McCammon's early novels"; however, literary scholar Neil McRobert found it to be "unrepresentative of McCammon's oeuvre" and "derivative of more successful fiction by (a) more established author()."

References

1980 American novels
Novels set in the Caribbean
Avon (publisher) books